The Craven Week is an annual rugby union tournament organised for schoolboys in the Republic of South Africa. The tournament started in July 1964, and is named after the legendary Springbok rugby union player and coach Dr Danie Craven.

The tournament has its humble beginnings in an idea by Piet Malan, then Springbok flanker, in 1949, around the time of the South African Rugby Board's 75th anniversary. He wanted schools to feature in the celebrations and approached Danie Craven in Potgietersrus on how this could be done.

Dr Craven took the idea to his board who decided on getting the 15 schools unions together for a week. The man who kept the idea alive however was one Jan Preuyt, a former student at the University of Stellenbosch and teacher at Port Rex Technical School in East London. Preuyt had played rugby for Griqualand West and was also the chairman of Border Schools.

At the time there was no such thing as a South African Schools organisation, and the South African Rugby Board were not involved, so Preuyt and Border Schools arranged the first Craven Week tournament on their own.

The competition began with 15 teams in 1964, growing to 28 in 1987 and 32 in 2000.  The format was changed in 2001, and now allows for just 20 teams. Each of South Africa's fourteen provincial unions field at least one team, with some unions sending two squads (one from their urban base and another representing "country districts"), plus representation from Namibia and Zimbabwe in most years.

Each year since 1974 a South African schools team has been selected, and the competition has been open to players of all races since 1980 when Craven himself requested that it be done. The competition has since become a hunting ground for talent scouts trying to find the best new players for their provinces and many young upcoming stars see the tournament as an opportunity to further their careers. The format has been replicated at other age and skill levels, including a U18 Academy Week for provincial B sides, the Grant Khomo Week for U16 teams, and Iqhawe Week for U15 sides which places special emphasis on players from underprivileged or underserved areas.

Currently the tournament is known as the "Coca-Cola Craven Week" with The Coca-Cola Company as the main sponsor of the event.

Results

Despite there being no official final for the Craven Week tournaments, there is a main match every year that features the two best teams at the tournament. The results of these main matches since 1971 are:

See also
 South Africa national under-18 rugby union team

External links
 South Africa Schools Rugby Association
 School of Rugby Craven Week Website
 Rugby 365 Craven Week Site

References

Rugby union competitions in South Africa
1964 establishments in South Africa
High school rugby union